Cima  is a surname of Italian origin. People with that name include:

Annalisa Cima (born 1941), Italian poet
Giovanni Paolo Cima (about 1570 – 1622), Italian composer and organist in the early Baroque era
Michael Cima, American professor

See also
 Cima (disambiguation)

Surnames of Italian origin